The 1994 Broadland District Council election took place on 5 May 1994 to elect members of Broadland District Council in England. This was on the same day as other local elections.

Election results

References

1994 English local elections
May 1994 events in the United Kingdom
1994
1990s in Norfolk